Leimen (South Franconian: Lååme) is a town in north-west Baden-Württemberg, Germany. It is also the area's industrial centre.

Leimen is located on the Bergstraße (Mountain Road) and on the Bertha Benz Memorial Route.

In the context of a communal reform in the 1970s, Leimen was newly created from the villages Leimen, Gauangelloch and Sankt Ilgen. In 1981, the state government of Baden-Württemberg granted Leimen the privilege to be called "town." When Leimen's population exceeded 20,000 in 1990, the city council applied for elevation to a Große Kreisstadt which was granted by the state government on 1 April 1992.

History 

The first documentary record of Leimen is from 791, when both the Lorsch Abbey and the Diocese of Worms owned land there. First records of the districts are from 1270 for Gauangelloch (a document supposedly from 1016 was found out to be a fake), 1312 for Lingental, around 1300 for Ochsenbach and 1100 for Sankt Ilgen, then called bruch, an Old High German word for bog.

In 1262, the lords of Bruchsal gave Leimen to the Electorate of the Palatinate as a fiefdom and from 1464 on Leimen was part of the Palatinate. In 1579, Leimen was granted the right to celebrate an annual fair and became a marketplace in 1595. In 1674, Leimen was partially destroyed.

Mayors
Johann Ludwig Waldbauer 1838–1844
Heinrich Seitz 1845–1876
Jakob Rehm III. 1876–1882
Leonhard Schneider 1882–1883
Ludwig Endlich 1883–1896
Christoph Lingg 1883–1923
Jakob Weidemaier 1923–1933 
Fritz Wisswesser 1933–1945
Jakob Weidemaier 1945
Georg Appel 1946–1948
Otto Hoog 1948–1976
Herbert Ehrbar 1976–2000 (from 1992 Lord Mayor)

Lord Mayor
Wolfgang Ernst 2000–2016
 since 2016: Hans D. Reinwald

People, culture and architecture 

Leimen consists of the Leimen (proper), nowadays called "Leimen (Mitte)", and the four boroughs Gauangelloch, Lingental, Ochsenbach and Sankt Ilgen.

Despite its industrial roots, Leimen's downtown has maintained a certain quaintness. It is an active town, with a regular cycle of festivals and activities.

At Ochsenbach, there is the NDB NKR.

Notable people

Joseph von Henikstein (1768–1838), businessman and financier, art patron and friend of Wolfgang Amadeus Mozart
Bert Hellinger (1925–2019), psychotherapist and author
Michael Peter (1949–1997), field hockey player, Olympic winner
Rainer Zietsch (born 1964), football player and coach
Ralph Götz (born 1967), rugby player and administrator
Boris Becker (born 1967), tennis player
Clemens von Grumbkow (born 1983), rugby union player
Akeem Vargas (born 1990), basketball player, grew up in Leimen
Anne Spiegel (born 1980), German politician, born in Leimen

Twin towns – sister cities

Leimen is twinned with:

 Castanheira de Pera, Portugal
 Cernay-lès-Reims, France
 Kunín, Czech Republic
 Mafra, Portugal
 Tigy, France
 Tinqueux, France

References 

Towns in Baden-Württemberg
Rhein-Neckar-Kreis
Baden